The Fitzroy Tavern is a public house situated at Charlotte Street in the Fitzrovia district of central London, England, owned by the Samuel Smith Brewery.

It became famous during a period spanning the 1920s to the mid-1950s as a meeting place for many of London's artists, intellectuals and bohemians such as Jacob Epstein, Nina Hamnett, Dylan Thomas, Augustus John, and George Orwell.

It is named either directly or indirectly after the Fitzroy family, Dukes of Grafton, who owned much of the land on which Fitzrovia was built.

The building was originally constructed as the Fitzroy Coffee House, in 1883, and converted to a pub (called "The Hundred Marks") in 1887, by W. M. Brutton. In the early years of the 20th century, Judah Morris Kleinfeld became licensee. He rebranded it the "Fitzroy Tavern" in March 1919. The licence then passed to his daughter and her husband Charles Allchild who ran it into the 1950s.

His granddaughter Sally Fiber who worked behind the bar from a very young age eventually wrote a history of the pub, "The Fitzroy: The Autobiography of a London Tavern" with the help of Clive Powell-Williams. There are photographs on the walls of both Michael Bentine and Dylan Thomas drinking in the pub.

By the 1990s, the Fitzroy came to be closely associated with the fandom of Doctor Who and held regular fan meetings. Many figures associated with the show were also regular patrons, including Russell T Davies, Steven Moffat, Paul Cornell, Nicholas Briggs, and Mark Gatiss.

Since 2000 it has been the home of the Pear Shaped Comedy Club which runs every Wednesday in the downstairs bar.

In 2018, the pub was given a pub design award by CAMRA for its 2015 refurbishment, in which its original Victorian appearance was retained and revived. Polished mahogany partitions with acid-etched glass were installed downstairs to recreate the original snugs, while wrought-iron pub signs in keeping with the originals were erected outside.

References 

Buildings and structures in the London Borough of Camden
Doctor Who fandom
Fitzrovia
Tourist attractions in the London Borough of Camden
Pubs in the London Borough of Camden